Nafud al-Urayq Natural Reserve is a protected area in Saudi Arabia managed by the Saudi Wildlife Authority.

Overview 
The natural reserve is located in Najd in central Saudi Arabia and occupying approximately 2036.1 km2. It was listed as a protected area in 1995.

Flora and wildlife 
The reserve is characterized by floras of and Haloxylon salicornicum and Calligonum. It is also a habitat to the Houbara bustard, hyaena, and wolf.

See also 

 List of protected areas of Saudi Arabia

References 



Protected areas of Saudi Arabia